Łukasz Kubot and Oliver Marach were the defending champions; however, they lost to Santiago González and Máximo González in the quarterfinals.
Victor Hănescu and Horia Tecău won the final against Marcelo Melo and Bruno Soares 6–1, 6–3.

Seeds

  Bob Bryan /  Mike Bryan (first round)
  Łukasz Kubot /  Oliver Marach (quarterfinals)
  Mark Knowles /  Michal Mertiňák (first round)
  Marcelo Melo /  Bruno Soares (final)

Draw

Draw

External links
 Main Draw

Abierto Mexicano Telcel - Doubles
2011 Abierto Mexicano Telcel